Pico Sacro is a summit in the central Galician Massif and the municipality of Boqueixón.

It is known for its peculiar shape and a legend about apostle James, son of Zebedee. In galician mythology a tomb for the apostle was to be constructed at the summit, until it was known that a dragon lived at that place.

Pico Sacro is 530 metres above sea level.

References 
 As montañas de Galiza. A Nosa Terra, 2006. 

Galician Massif
Mountains of Galicia (Spain)